Grevillea diversifolia, the variable-leaved grevillea, is a species of flowering plant in the family Proteaceae and is endemic to the south-west of Western Australia. It is an erect to prostrate shrub with simple or divided leaves and groups white to cream-coloured flowers with a dull red style.

Description
The lower surface of the leaves is sometimes glabrous, sometimes densely covered with silky hairs.

Taxonomy
Grevillea diversifolia was first formally described by botanist Carl Meissner in 1845 in Johann Georg Christian Lehmann's Plantae Preissianae from specimens collected in 1839 by James Drummond near the Vasse River.

In 1986 Donald McGillivray described two subspecies and the names are accepted by the Australian Plant Census:

Distribution and habitat
Subspecies diversifolia grows in shrubby or woodland, often in moist places between Mundaring Weir and Donnybrook in the Jarrah Forest and Swan Coastal Plain biogeographic regions of south-western Western Australia. Subspecies subtersericata grows in shrubland, often near watercourses, from near Albany to near Broke Inlet in the Avon Wheatbelt, Jarrah Forest and Warren biogeographic regions.

Conservation status
Both subspecies of G. diversifolia are listed as "not threatened" by the Government of Western Australia Department of Biodiversity, Conservation and Attractions.

References

diversifolia
Endemic flora of Western Australia
Eudicots of Western Australia
Proteales of Australia
Taxa named by Carl Meissner
Plants described in 1845